Blepharidopterus angulatus, the black-kneed capsid, is a species of plant bug in the family Miridae. It is found in North Africa, Europe East across the Palearctic to Central Asia and in North America.

Biology
The bugs feed mainly as predators of mites, mite eggs, aphids and other soft-bodied arthropods on various deciduous trees and shrubs. They are found mainly on  Alnus,  Betula , Corylus, Fraxinus, Ulmus, Tilia , Salix, Populus,  Carpinus  and Fagus. Occasionally suck also on the immature seeds of the plants.

B. angulatus has one generation per year. Eggs are laid from July to October in the wood of trees where they remain embedded until the following spring. Nymphal stages develop in 35 to 39 days. Adult females can deposit up to 43 eggs, their life span is 51 days. Up to 4000 mites can be consumed by a female, or about 50 mites per day. This species feeds on plant tissue, but it does not cause injury on plants.

References

Further reading

External links

 

Articles created by Qbugbot
Insects described in 1807
Orthotylini
Taxa named by Carl Fredrik Fallén